Goffredo Parise (8 December 1929 in Vicenza – 31 August 1986 in Treviso) was an Italian writer, journalist, and screenwriter. He won the Viareggio Prize in 1965 for his novel Il padrone (The Boss) and the Strega Prize in 1982 for Sillabario n.2.

Works 
The Dead Boy and the Comets, translated by Marianne Ceconi, New York: Farrar, Straus and Young, 1953
Don Gastone and the Ladies, trans. by Stuart Hood, New York: Knopf, 1955
The Boss, trans. by William Weaver, New York: Knopf, 1966
Solitudes, trans. by Isabel Quigly, introduction by Natalia Ginzburg, New York: Vintage, 1982
Abecedary, trans. by James Marcus, Marlboro, Vt.: Marlboro Press, 1990
The Smell of Blood, trans by John Shepley, Evanston, Ill.: Marlboro Press/Northwestern, 2003

Selected filmography 
 Boccaccio '70 (1962)
 La cuccagna (1962)
 Careless (1962)  
 Agostino (1962)
 Oggi, domani, dopodomani (1965)

References

1929 births
1986 deaths
20th-century Italian novelists
20th-century Italian male writers
Italian atheists
Italian male journalists
People from Vicenza
Strega Prize winners
Viareggio Prize winners
Italian male novelists
20th-century Italian journalists